Åsa-Nisse Goes Hunting (Swedish: Åsa-Nisse på jaktstigen) is a 1950 Swedish comedy film directed by Ragnar Frisk and starring John Elfström,  Artur Rolén  and Helga Brofeldt. It was the second film in the long-running Åsa-Nisse series about a raffish character living in rural Småland. The film's sets were designed by the art director Bertil Duroj.

Synopsis
Åsa-Nisse is fond of poaching, but a new constable has his eye on them. When Åsa-Nisse gets his foot caught in a trap, he is arrested and taken to the city of Jönköping for trial. The same evening he and his companions go out for a night on the town where they meet two attractive young woman. Sometime later Åsa-Nisse has to explain with difficulty to his wife just what they got up to that night.

Cast
 John Elfström as 	Åsa-Nisse
 Artur Rolén as 	Klabbarparn
 Helga Brofeldt as 	Eulalia
 Bertil Boo as Eric Broo
 Emy Hagman as 	Elsa Broo
 Ulla-Carin Rydén as Britta
 Gustaf Lövås as 	Sjökvist
 Josua Bengtson as 	Jönsson
 Lillie Wästfeldt as 	Kristin
 Willy Peters as 	Klöverhage
 Mary Rapp as 	Astrid
 Siv Ericks as 	Greta
 Arne Källerud as Judge

References

Bibliography 
 Krawc, Alfred. International Directory of Cinematographers, Set- and Costume Designers in Film: Denmark, Finland, Norway, Sweden (from the beginnings to 1984). Saur, 1986.

External links 
 

1950 films
Swedish comedy films
1950 comedy films
1950s Swedish-language films
Films directed by Ragnar Frisk
Swedish black-and-white films
1950s Swedish films